The 2000 Singer Sri Lankan Airlines Rugby 7s was the second year of the Singer Sri Lankan Airlines Rugby 7s tournament. All matches were played at Bogambara Stadium in Kandy, Sri Lanka. Following the success of the inaugural competition the previous year the tournament was made an open event and expanded to 16 teams, with four teams from Europe competing. Chinese Taipei defeated South Korea 38 points to 21 in the final of the Cup, with the Bowl final won by Thailand and the Plate final by Japan.

Group stage

Pool A

 59 - 00  Barbarians
 26 - 07 
 47 - 00  Arabian Gulf
 14 - 05  Barbarians
 Barbarians 31 - 14  Arabian Gulf
 Arabian Gulf 29 - 11 

{| class="wikitable" style="text-align: center;"
|-
!width="200"|Teams
!width="40"|Pld
!width="40"|W
!width="40"|D
!width="40"|L
!width="40"|PF
!width="40"|PA
!width="40"|+/−
!width="40"|Pts
|-style="background:#ccffcc"
|align=left| 
|3||3||0||0||132||07||+125||9
|-style="background:#ccffcc"
|align=left|  Arabian Gulf
|3||1||0||2||43||89||-46||5
|-style="background:#ffe6bd"
|align=left| 
|3||1||0||2||33||60||-27||5
|-style="background:#fcc6bd"
|align=left|  Barbarians
|3||1||0||2||36||87||−51||5
|}

Pool B

 19 - 14 
 19 - 14 
 26 - 21 
 28 - 07 
 36 - 07 
 19 - 00 

{| class="wikitable" style="text-align: center;"
|-
!width="200"|Teams
!width="40"|Pld
!width="40"|W
!width="40"|D
!width="40"|L
!width="40"|PF
!width="40"|PA
!width="40"|+/−
!width="40"|Pts
|-style="background:#ccffcc"
|align=left| 
|3||3||0||0||66||21||+45||9
|-style="background:#ccffcc"
|align=left| 
|3||2||0||1||45||54||-9||7
|-style="background:#ffe6bd"
|align=left| 
|3||1||0||2||71||52||+19||5
|-style="background:#fcc6bd"
|align=left| 
|3||0||0||3||28||83||-55||3
|}

Pool C

 24 - 07 
 45 - 12 
 28 - 17 
  19 - 19 
 38 - 07 
  45 - 07 

{| class="wikitable" style="text-align: center;"
|-
!width="200"|Teams
!width="40"|Pld
!width="40"|W
!width="40"|D
!width="40"|L
!width="40"|PF
!width="40"|PA
!width="40"|+/−
!width="40"|Pts
|-style="background:#ccffcc"
|align=left|  
|3||2||1||0||88||33||+55||8
|-style="background:#ccffcc"
|align=left| 
|3||2||1||0||92||48||+44||7
|-style="background:#ffe6bd"
|align=left| 
|3||1||0||2||62||59||-3||5
|-style="background:#fcc6bd"
|align=left| 
|3||0||0||3||26||128||−102||3
|}

Pool D

 49 - 00 
  47 - 07 
 70 - 00 
 28 - 19 
 42 - 07 
 40 - 00 

{| class="wikitable" style="text-align: center;"
|-
!width="200"|Teams
!width="40"|Pld
!width="40"|W
!width="40"|D
!width="40"|L
!width="40"|PF
!width="40"|PA
!width="40"|+/−
!width="40"|Pts
|-style="background:#ccffcc"
|align=left|  
|3||3||0||0||145||26||+119||9
|-style="background:#ccffcc"
|align=left| 
|3||2||0||1||101||35||+66||7
|-style="background:#ffe6bd"
|align=left|  
|3||2||0||1||63||89||-26||5
|-style="background:#fcc6bd"
|align=left| 
|3||0||0||3||159||00||−159||3
|}

Second round

Bowl

Plate

Cup

References

2000
2000 rugby sevens competitions
2000 in Asian rugby union
rugby sevens